The Draughts World Championship is the world championship in international draughts and is held every two years. In the even year following the tournament, the World Title match takes place. The men's championship began in 1885 in France and since 1948 it's organised by the World Draughts Federation (FMJD). The men's championship has had winners from the Netherlands, Canada, the Soviet Union, Senegal, Latvia, and Russia.

The current men's champion is Roel Boomstra.

Since 1998, there is also a Draughts World Championship held with the blitz time control (5 minutes plus an increment of 5 seconds per move), and since 2014 also with the rapid time control (15 min + 5 sec per move).

World title match
The championship is held every two years, in the odd years. The world title match takes place in the even year following the world championship tournament. The former champion and the new champion qualify for the world title match. If the former champion retains his title in the World Championship tournament, the runner-up earns the right to challenge him.

Unofficial champions (which are not listed here) were awarded retroactively; the first champion being Anatole Dussaut in 1885. A full list of winners can be found here.

Classic

Rapid

Blitz

See also
List of Draughts World Championship winners
List of women's Draughts World Championship winners
Women's World Draughts Championship

References

External links
Site FMJD. World Champions Men (100)
Results in database KNDB
World Championships Blitz

 
Recurring sporting events established in 1948
Draughts competitions